Malvar is a white Spanish wine grape variety that is predominantly grown in the province of Madrid where it is a permitted variety in the Denominación de Origen (DO) of Vinos de Madrid. In the late 20th century there was nearly 2500 ha (6200 acres) of Malvar planted. According to wine expert Jancis Robinson, Malvar produces slightly "rustic", medium-bodied wines that tend to exhibit more aroma and flavor than Airén, which is also widely planted in Madrid. Spanish synonyms include Lairén.

References

Spanish wine
Grape varieties of Spain
White wine grape varieties